Lesley Hazleton (born 1945) is a British-American author whose work focuses on the intersection and interactions between politics and religion.

Biography and career 
Hazleton has reported from Jerusalem for Time, and has written on the Middle East for numerous publications including The New York Times, The New York Review of Books, Harper's, The Nation, and The New Republic.

Born in England, she was based in Jerusalem from 1966 to 1979 and in New York City from 1979 to 1992, when she moved to a floating home in Seattle, originally to get her pilot's license, and became a U.S. citizen. She has two degrees in psychology (B.A. Manchester University, M.A. Hebrew University of Jerusalem).

Hazleton has described herself as "a Jew who once seriously considered becoming a rabbi, a former convent schoolgirl who daydreamed about being a nun, an agnostic with a deep sense of religious mystery though no affinity for organized religion".  "Everything is paradox," she has said. "The danger is one-dimensional thinking".

In April 2010, she launched The Accidental Theologist, a blog casting "an agnostic eye on religion, politics, and existence."  In September 2011, she received The Stranger'''s Genius Award in Literature  and in fall 2012, she was the Inaugural Scholar-in-Residence at Town Hall Seattle.

Her latest book, Agnostic: A Spirited Manifesto, a Publishers Weekly most-anticipated book of spring 2016, was praised by The New York Times as "vital and mischievous" and as "wide-ranging... yet intimately grounded in our human, day-to-day life."

TED talks

TEDGlobal 2013: The Doubt Essential to Faith. Thumbnail: "When Lesley Hazleton was writing a biography of Prophet Muhammad, she was struck by something: The night he received the revelation of the Koran, according to early accounts, his first reaction was doubt, awe, even fear. And yet this experience became the bedrock of his belief. Hazleton calls for a new appreciation of doubt and questioning as the foundation of faith — and an end to fundamentalism of all kinds."

TEDxRainier 2010: On Reading the Koran. Thumbnail: "Lesley Hazleton sat down one day to read the Qur'an. And what she found — as a non-Muslim, a self-identified "tourist" in the Islamic holy book — wasn't what she expected. With serious scholarship and warm humor, Hazleton shares the grace, flexibility and mystery she found, in this myth-debunking talk."

TEDSummit 2016: "What we talk about when we talk about soul."

TEDxSeattle: "What's wrong with dying?"

Books

On religion and politics:
 Agnostic: A Spirited Manifesto  2016 (New York Times Editors' Choice)
 The First Muslim: The Story of Muhammad (2013)  (New York Times Editors' Choice)
 After the Prophet: The Epic Story of the Hero Split (2009)  (Finalist:  2010 PEN-USA book award.)
 Jezebel: The Untold Story of the Bible's Harlot Queen (2007)  (Finalist: 2008 Washington Book Award.)
 Mary: A Flesh-and-Blood Biography(2008)  (Winner: 2005 Washington Book Award.)
 Jerusalem, Jerusalem: A Memoir of War and Peace, Passion and Politics  (Winner: 1987 American Jewish Committee/Present Tense Book Award).
 Where Mountains Roar: a Personal Report from the Sinai 
 Israeli Women: The Reality Behind the Myths 

Her other books include:
 England, Bloody England: An Expatriate's Return 
 Confessions of a Fast Woman (1986) 
 Driving to Detroit: An Automotive Odyssey''

References

External links
 Who is the AT? The Accidental Theologist.
 
 "The doubt essential to faith" (TEDGlobal 2013)
 "On reading the Koran" (TEDxRainier 2010)
 twitter

1945 births
Living people
American people of English-Jewish descent
English agnostics
Jewish scholars of Islam
Jewish agnostics
American women writers
English Jewish writers
Women scholars of Islam
American scholars of Islam